The Syriac Catholic Patriarchal Dependency of Sudan and South Sudan is missionary pre-diocesan jurisdiction of the Eastern Catholic Syriac Catholic Church (sui iuris, Antiochian Rite in Syriac language) covering Sudan and South Sudan.

It is immediately subject to the Syriac Catholic Patriarch of Antioch (in Beirut, Lebanon), not part of any ecclesiastical province.

As a mission of very low rank, roughly comparable to a Latin Mission sui iuris, it has no cathedral see nor an episcopal ordinary of its own.
 
So far, the office of superior, styled Protosyncellus (normally a function in an episcopal curia), has been  vested in the Syriac Catholic Eparch of Cairo, in Egypt.

History 
 Established in 1997 as Territory Dependent on the Patriarch of Sudan, on territory formerly not covered by the particular church.
 Renamed in 2013 as Territory Dependent on the Patriarch of Sudan and South Sudan, after the latter country seceded from the first.

Ordinaries 
(all West Syriac Rite)Protosyncellus of Sudan  
 Clément-Joseph Hannouche (1997 – 2013 see below), while Eparch of Cairo of the Syrians (Egypt) (Jun 24, 1995  – Apr 9, 2020)Protosyncelli of Sudan and South Sudan 
 Clément-Joseph Hannouche (see above'' 2013 – Apr 9, 2020), while Eparch of Cairo of the Syrians (Egypt) (Jun 24, 1995, – Apr 9, 2020)
 Bishop Camil Afram Antoine Semaan (Apr 15, 2020  – May 12, 2022)
 Bishop Élie Joseph Warde (May 12, 2022 - )

Source and External links 
  [self-published source]
Dalle Chiese Orientali, 12.05.2022 (in Italian)

 

Eastern Catholic dioceses in Africa
Syriac Catholic dioceses
Catholic Church in Sudan